Sustainable healthcare is organised medical care that ensures the health needs of the current population are met, without compromising environmental, economic or social resources for future generations.

The World Health Organization (WHO) defines an environmentally sustainable health care system as ‘as a health system that improves, maintains or restores health, while minimizing negative impacts on the environment and leveraging opportunities to restore and improve it, to the benefit of the health and well-being of current and future generations’....
It aims to reframe medical practice and the health sector to address human health in the context of Planetary health, where earth systems and humans are reciprocal.

Sustainable healthcare acknowledges all these dimensions of sustainability (environmental, economic and social, also called the 3 pillars of sustainability), delivering healthcare that does not damage the environment (either now or in the future), is economical and has a positive social impact.

The effects of climate change on human health 

See Effects of climate change on human health

The World Health Organization (WHO) has describes climate change as the biggest health threat facing humanity, highlighting that those in low-income and disadvantaged communities, who historically contributed least to the causes of climate change, are being affected first and hit the hardest. These concerns are also seen in ‘The Lancet Countdown’, an annual report published in The Lancet medical journal by a group of international experts; it makes an assessment of how climate change is impacting human health. In 2016 the report described the effects of climate change on human health as ‘potentially catastrophic’.

Threats to human health vary from direct injury following extreme weather events, exacerbation of respiratory disease due to air pollution, change in the distribution of vector borne disease, increase likelihood of zoonotic diseases, malnutrition following crop failures, negative impact on mental health, heat related illness and many more.

The impact of healthcare on climate change 

Healthcare is a significant contributor to climate change and environmental degradation. According to estimates, healthcare is responsible for approximately 4.4% of global net emissions, this means if the worlds healthcare systems were one country, it would be the fifth-largest emitter on the planet.

In addition to greenhouse gas emissions, healthcare also contributes to local air pollution.  For example, in England it is estimated that 3.5% of all road travel in the country is related to the National Health Service (NHS); due to a combination of patient, visitor and staff travel and delivery of supplies.
The waste generated by healthcare, such as pharmaceuticals and plastic pollution, also has a negative impact on planetary health. In the United States, it is estimated that pollution caused by healthcare results in a loss of 388,000 disability-adjusted life years (DALYs) annually.

Reducing the environmental impact of healthcare has a positive impact on both climate change and human health.

Approaches to Sustainable Healthcare

In 2017 the World Health Organization (WHO) published a strategic document outlining 10 actions points to improve environmental sustainability in healthcare systems. This included points such as sustainable procurement, reducing air pollution and greenhouse gas emissions from healthcare, prioritising public health measures to prevent disease and improving efficiency of resource use.

In 2021, prior to the 26th UN Climate Change Conference of Parties (COP) in Glasgow, a joint editorial published simultaneously in 233 medical journals around the world highlighted the health consequences of climate change and the need for immediate political action. It also called on healthcare professionals to ‘join in the work to achieve environmentally sustainable health systems before 2040’. Emphasizing that this will inevitably mean a change in clinical practice.

Greener NHS

One example of a healthcare system making changes towards sustainability is the UK’s National Health Service (NHS). In 2020 it became the first healthcare service in the world to commit to a target of net zero. To achieve this target the ‘Greener NHS programme’ was created. In 2020 Greener NHS published a report ‘Delivering a Net Zero National Health Service’, which outlines how the NHS can achieve net zero. In this report the sources of carbon emissions across the NHS are summarised, this highlights various ‘hotspots’ where a high proportion of emissions can be targeted. Estates and facilities (including building energy) is highlighted as one hotspot, but there are also opportunities for change in supply chain, pharmaceuticals, medical devices and travel; all of which are directly influenced by the choices of clinicians, recognising that that a change in clinical practice will be required.

Healthcare without Harm

Healthcare without Harm is a nongovernmental organization (NGO) that aims to reduce the environmental impact of healthcare around the world. It was established in the United States of America (USA) in 1996 after a team of health care professionals realised the bi-products of the medical waste incinerators were having a direct negative impact on the health of the local population. The organisation now works internationally to assist health care organisations in delivering healthcare, without negatively impacting human health or causing environmental damage.

The Global Climate and Health Alliance

The Global Climate and Health Alliance (GCHA) is an international organisation of health care and development groups.  The aim of the organisation is centred around minimising the health impacts of climate change and encouraging the health co-benefits achieved by tackling climate change.

Five Principles of Sustainable Healthcare

The ‘Five Principles of Sustainable Healthcare’ have been proposed as a model to facilitate sustainable decision making at all levels of the healthcare system and clinical practice. The order of the principles was specifically designed to reflect their power (and therefore importance) to achieve sustainable change

In order they are ‘Prevention’ (preventing disease and encouraging healthier populations), ‘patient self-care’ (equipping patients to manage own health), ‘lean service delivery’ (improving efficiency), ‘low carbon alternatives’ (of treatments or interventions where available) and ‘facilities’ (minimising environmental impact of infrastructure).

Sustainability in Quality Improvement

The quality of care delivered in a health care system often depends on a complex network of processes and pathways. Quality Improvement in healthcare is when health care professionals familiar with these processes and pathways use a systematic approach to address specific problems in their field, thereby improving the process or pathway with a measurable effect. Traditionally this measurable effect may be improved clinical outcomes, time saved or money saved.

Sustainable quality improvement looks to take a broader view of the measurable effect, considering social and environmental outcomes alongside financial ones. This is also known as the Triple Bottom Line. This principle was applied to the sustainable value of healthcare by including sustainability as a domain of quality in healthcare. Rather than just assessing a treatment or interventions value against its clinical outcome and financial cost, social and environmental cost are also considered.

References